Edenborn is an unincorporated community and census-designated place in German Township, Fayette County, Pennsylvania, United States. It is located along Pennsylvania Route 166, just north of Pennsylvania Route 21. As of the 2010 census, the population was 294.

Demographics

References

External links

Census-designated places in Fayette County, Pennsylvania
Census-designated places in Pennsylvania